Acrolophus melanodoxa is a moth of the family Acrolophidae. It is found in French Guiana.

References

Moths described in 1919
melanodoxa